The Mary Brogan Museum of Arts and Science, also known as the Brogan Museum and MOAS was an art and science museum located at 350 South Duval Street, Tallahassee, Florida.

History 
Located in downtown Tallahassee on Kleman Plaza, the museum was formed from the merger of two struggling Tallahassee museums, The Museum of Art/Tallahassee and the Odyssey Science Center. The two former organizations were created independently in 1990 and 1991 respectively. The organizations agreed to share a common building, opening to the public in 1998, and to merge in 2000. The building was constructed on land belonging to The City of Tallahassee and the Museum executed a transfer of its sub-lease to Tallahassee Community College (TCC) from Leon County Schools in 2003. It was named posthumously after former Florida Lt. Governor Frank Brogan's wife, who died of cancer in 1997. Mrs. Brogan had worked as an educational consultant during her husband's tenure as Lt. Governor and had a strong interest in arts and education.

Exhibitions and Programs 
The Museum was part of Association of Science and Technology Centers (ASTC) as well as a Smithsonian Affiliate. The museum's mission was to stimulate interest in, and understanding of, how visual arts, sciences, mathematics, and technology connect. The museum had two floors of interactive science exhibits, an art gallery displaying a range of works as well as a gift shop, educational classrooms and rental space for special events.
A few notable exhibitions the museum staged include Bodies: The Exhibition in 2009, Dale Chihuly's Seaforms in 2003 and multiple showings of the various Kokoro Sanrio animatronic dinosaurs.

The museum ran a day-camp program focused on Art and Sciences, called "Camp All That!". Other programs and activates included StarLab (planetarium), EcoLab (aquatic life tanks) and the WCTV Weather station. The Museum was also home for many years to a beloved guinea pig named George.

Florida's World War II Memorial 
In 2004, in conjunction with the Florida Department of Education, the Florida Department of State and the Institute on World War Two and the Human Experience, the museum developed a curriculum for American History supplement on CD's, featuring historical educational materials, personal histories and interviews.

Selected Science Exhibitions and Programs 
2003: Seeing the Unseen: Photographs by Harold Edgerton

2010: Videotopia

2008: The Roswell Exhibit

2010: STRIDe Lab ME2 outreach program

Selected Art Exhibitions 
2001: Hello Cuba. Braking Barriers Contemporary Cuban Contemporary Art

2005: Art and Ecology Triennial

2006: Transitory Patterns: Florida Women Artists

2009: The Kinsey Collection

2008: Enrique Chavarria: Journey Into the Subconscious

2010: North by Southwest, Native American Art: From the Collection of : I.S.K. Reeves V & Sara W. Reeves

2010:  Appetite: Expressions of the Politics Encircling Food

2011: Titanic: The Artifact Exhibition

2011: Coming Out of the Closet: Clothing Art as an Emergent Form

Controversies 
In 2007, the art installation "The Proper Way to Hang a Confederate Flag" by artist John Sims garnered criticism from the local Sons of Confederate Veterans chapter. The piece, depicting a Confederate Battle Flag hanging from a wooden arm in a noose, was cited as "offensive, objectionable and tasteless" by Sons of Veterans members. The Brogan executive director noted "There's a balance between the nature of the art that we show and the outcome that we seek, which is to promote dialogue and conversation, and have you maybe think of something in a slightly different way". The Florida Attorney General's office agreed that no laws were broken with the display.

In 2008, "The Roswell Exhibit" was controversial with local scientists who believed a museum dedicated in part to science should not be promoting "the pseudoscience of UFO's".

In 2009, the Bodies: The Exhibition show faced criticism due to possible human rights violations, resulting in a joint effort by the Florida Legislature and Anatomical Board of the State of Florida to restrict exhibits requiring museums to confirm that the human remains on display were ethically obtained.

In 2011, the Museum was requested to hold on to a piece of artwork that was part of a recently closed exhibit. The piece, “Christ Carrying the Cross Dragged by a Rogue,” by the Italian Renaissance artist Girolamo Romano, was reportedly looted from a Jewish family during the Holocaust. It was eventually returned to the heirs of the family.

Closure  
In January 2012, TCC and the board of directors announced the "indefinite" closure of the Museum. The staff continued to offer limited programs, including "Camp All That!" through the summer of 2012. TCC and the board of directors spent most of the 2013 attempting to bridge the financial gap, including selling some of the museums artwork collection. In early 2013, when a bid for $150,000 in funding from Leon County fell through, the museum closed permanently, with "dire financial straits" and an inability to bring in "blockbuster" exhibits cited as reasons behind the closure.

Subsequent Use of the Building 
In 2014 there were efforts to use the bottom floor for a non-profit center, while the upper floors were tangled in a legal dispute. According to the Tallahassee Democrat:

"Attorneys for both sides are attempting to clean up a "messy lease," first created in January 1992 when the school board was granted state funds to construct the building on land owned by the city of Tallahassee. The state money came with strings that mandate particular uses for the building. Expansion to the vacant areas can't occur until the Leon County School Board approves the terms of yet another amended lease."

By 2017, the building had been fully repurposed by TCC as non-profit innovation center:

"The 34,000-square-foot facility, which formerly housed the Mary Brogan Museum of Art and Science, underwent significant renovations. It now houses offices and conference rooms for rent, technology infused training and collaboration spaces, a retail incubator, tenants including WTXL-ABC 27 and a New Horizons Computer Learning Center, the Institute for Nonprofit Innovation and Excellence, and a Starbucks coffee shop. The Starbucks is licensed by TCC to help support retail training and student job opportunities and is part of TCC’s commitment to advance entrepreneurship in the College and the community."

In early 2020, after three years, TCC announced they were closing the Starbucks coffee shop located in the former museum gift shop space, citing financial struggles and high staff turnover.

Notes

Art museums and galleries in Florida
Defunct art museums and galleries in the United States
Culture of Tallahassee, Florida
Museums in Tallahassee, Florida
Defunct museums in Florida
Science museums in Florida
Museums disestablished in 2013
Museums established in 1998
1998 establishments in Florida
2013 disestablishments in Florida